Justøya or Justøy is an island in Lillesand municipality in Agder county, Norway.  The  island lies just south of the town of Lillesand with the Skaggerak to the east and the Blindleia strait and the mainland to the west. The name comes from Old Norse word Jóstr.

At , Justøy is one of Agder county's largest islands. There are about 360 residents on the island located in scattered settlements across the island. The old outport, Brekkestø, lies on the south side of the island. The outport is one of the remains from the time of sailing ships in the Skagerrak coast. The island is largely characterized by summer tourism. There are Montessori school, Justøy Chapel, cemetery, pension boarding house, campsite, and the summer shop in Brekkestø.

In Nyberg, just north of Brekkestø, are the Festung Björkestraße ruins from World War II. The German fortifications and bunkers in Nyberg that were built by Norwegian prisoners of war.

See also
List of islands of Norway

References 

Lillesand
Islands of Agder